Tapas Posman (born 16 October 1973) is a Papua New Guinean footballer who plays as a goalkeeper. He has won six caps for the Papua New Guinea national football team.

External links

1973 births
Living people
Papua New Guinean footballers
Papua New Guinea international footballers
Association football goalkeepers
2002 OFC Nations Cup players